Il Pirata: Marco Pantani is a 2007 Italian television film written and directed by Claudio Bonivento.

The film is loosely based on the book Pantani: eroe tragico by Pier Bergonzi, Davide Cassani and Ivan Zazzaroni and it depicts real life events of road racing cyclist Marco Pantani.

Plot

Cast  
 Rolando Ravello as  Marco Pantani, aka Il Pirata
 Nicoletta Romanoff as  Christina 
 Ivano Marescotti as  Beltrame 
  Gianfelice Facchetti as  Francesco
  Franco Mescolini  as Grandpa Sotero
 Solveig D'Assunta as Marco's mother
  Maurizio Tafani as Marco's father
  Massimiliano Franciosa as  Giordano
  Marco Rossi as  Pantani as a child
 Omero Antonutti as  Ridolfi
 Gianni Minà as Himself
 Felice Gimondi as Himself

References

External links

2007 television films
2007 films
Italian television films
2007 biographical drama films
Films set in Italy
Italian biographical drama films
Cultural depictions of Italian men
Cultural depictions of cyclists
Biographical films about sportspeople
Cycling films
2007 drama films
Films directed by Claudio Bonivento
2000s Italian films